Take It to the Limit may refer to:

 "Take It to the Limit" (Eagles song), 1975
 Take It to the Limit (Hinder album), or the title song
 Take It to the Limit (Willie Nelson and Waylon Jennings album), includes a cover of the Eagles song
 "Take It to the Limit" (Centory song), 1994
 Take It to the Limit (Norman Connors album), 1980